Time Team Digs is a British television series that aired on Channel 4 in 2002. Presented by the actor Tony Robinson, the show is a spin-off of the archaeology series Time Team, that first aired on Channel 4 in 1994. It is also known as Time Team Digs: A History of Britain.

Time Team Digs is an eight-part series including highlights from previous Time Team digs, with each episode focusing on a particular period in history, going from the Bronze Age to the modern day.

Production and cast
The series producer of Time Team Digs was Tim Taylor, the creator and producer of Time Team and its predecessor Time Signs. The executive producer was Philip Clarke and the producers were Jeremy Cross and Laurence Vulliamy. Tony Robinson, the presenter, was also the associate producer. Regular contributors on Time Team included: archaeologists Mick Aston, Phil Harding, Carenza Lewis, Neil Holbrook; Robin Bush (historian); Victor Ambrus (illustrator); Stewart Ainsworth (landscape investigator); John Gater, Chris Gaffney (geophysicists); Henry Chapman (surveyor).

Episodes
Time Team Digs aired for eight sixty-minute episodes, from 1 November to 27 December 2002. Each episode aired on a Friday.

{| class="wikitable plainrowheaders" style="width:100%; margin:auto;"
|-
! width="20"| # !! Episode!! width="120"| Original air date
{{Episode list
 |EpisodeNumber=1
 |Title=The Bronze Age
 |OriginalAirDate=
 |ShortSummary=Tony Robinson presents a rich picture of Bronze Age Britain from Time Team'''s 20-year archive, starting with the oldest man-made item ever found on the programme, a flint axe found in the topsoil in a Worcestershire field (dig no.40). And Mick explains how cropmarks in fields can be used to identify structures from different periods. As shown in the Waddon dig (dig no.49), Bronze Age monuments can be found rubbing shoulders with Iron Age remains - in this case, a henge. These mysterious and charismatic structures are often made of timber, and thus rot away. But in 1999 the team had the opportunity to watch the excavation of a complete henge preserved on a Norfolk coast - not without some opposition (dig no.45). One of Time Team's specialities is reconstruction, and they decided to replicate the original seahenge using ancient technology. In dig 24, dig 54 and dig 77 they did a similar exercise with wooden walkways. Tony is joined by Richard Bradley from Reading University, who explains why it's called the Bronze Age, illustrated with some beautiful objects from the period.
}}

|}

DVD releasesTime Team Digs was released on DVD in the UK (Region 2) on 7 March 2005. The 3-disc DVD set also contains a 30-minute documentary Behind the Scenes with Time Team and the 1997 and 1999 Time Team'' Christmas specials.

See also
 List of Time Team episodes
 Time Team Specials
 Time Team Others

References

2002 British television series debuts
2002 British television series endings
Channel 4 original programming
Time Team